Tamim ibn al-Mu'izz (died 1108) was the fifth ruler of the Zirids in Ifriqiya (1062–1108).

Tamim took over from his father al-Mu'izz ibn Badis (1016–1062) at a time when the Zirid realm found itself in a state of disintegration following the invasion of the Banu Hilal. Only the coastal towns were under control, and a reconquest of the hinterland from the Bedouin failed. Even on the coast the Zirids were not unchallenged - Tunis was lost to the Khurasanid dynasty (1063–1128). The capital, Mahdia, was attacked by the city-states of Genoa and Pisa in 1087 and forced to pay a high ransom - a sign of the growing dominance of Christian powers in the Mediterranean which also manifested itself in the Norman conquest of Sicily (1061–1093).

Tamim's son Yahya ibn Tamim inherited what was left of the Zirid kingdom in 1108.

References

Sources
 

11th-century births
1108 deaths
11th-century Berber people
12th-century Berber people
Zirid emirs of Ifriqiya
11th-century rulers in Africa
12th-century rulers in Africa
11th-century people of Ifriqiya
12th-century people of Ifriqiya